is a Japanese track and field athlete. She competed in the women's javelin throw at the 1964 Summer Olympics.

References

1939 births
Living people
Place of birth missing (living people)
Japanese female javelin throwers
Olympic female javelin throwers
Olympic athletes of Japan
Athletes (track and field) at the 1964 Summer Olympics
Asian Games gold medalists in athletics (track and field)
Asian Games gold medalists for Japan
Athletes (track and field) at the 1962 Asian Games
Medalists at the 1962 Asian Games
Japan Championships in Athletics winners
20th-century Japanese women